Sittwe District is a district of the Rakhine State in western Myanmar. The capital lies at Sittwe.

Administrative divisions
Sittwe District consists of the following townships:

 Pauktaw Township
 Ponnagyun Township
 Rathedaung Township
 Sittwe Township

Sittwe District also consisted of the following townships, which formed to become Mrauk-U District:

 Kyauktaw Township
 Mrauk-U Township
 Minbya Township
 Myebon Township

Sittwe
Districts of Myanmar
Rakhine State